The Yokosuka MXY9 Shuka (秋花, "Autumn flower") was a projected development of the MXY8 training glider, adding a small motorjet engine, the Tsu-11. It was intended to provide further training for pilots who were to fly the Mitsubishi J8M and Ki-200 rocket-powered interceptor aircraft.

None were built prior to Japan's surrender and the end of World War II.

Specifications (MXY9, as designed)

See also

Notes

References

Motorjet-powered aircraft
1940s Japanese experimental aircraft
World War II Japanese trainer aircraft
MXY9